Elenoire Casalegno (born 28 May 1976) is an Italian television presenter.

Life and career
Born in Savona, in 1994 Casalegno started her career at 17 years old as a runway model. In 1994, after winning the beauty contest Look of the Year, she debuted as television presenter of the Italia 1 musical show Jammin'''.

During her career Casalegno hosted several programs, including the sport talk show Pressing, alongside Raimondo Vianello, the variety show Scherzi a parte and the 1998 edition of Festivalbar. As an actress, she played Poppaea Sabina in the 1998 sitcom S.P.Q.R.'' aired by Italia 1.

References

External links  

 

1976 births
Living people
People from Savona 
Italian television actresses 
Italian television presenters 
Italian women television presenters